The following lists events that happened during 1963 in Singapore.
 Singapore was a 14th State of Malaysia beginning 16 September 1963.

Incumbents
 Yang di-Pertuan Negara – Yusof Ishak
 Prime Minister – Lee Kuan Yew

Events

January
6 January – The OG factory is officially opened.
20 January – Confrontation was announced.

February
2 February – Operation Coldstore was mounted to stop communist influence, resulting in 113 people being arrested.
15 February – The first TV station was launched on Channel 5. Regular television transmissions only started from 2 April.

March
13 March – The Civilian War Memorial will be built at Beach Road.

April
22 April – City Hall riot.

May
1 May – The Public Utilities Board is formed to manage electricity, water and gas.
25 May – The Ngee Ann College is officially opened, changing name from Ngee Ann Technical College and finally present-day Ngee Ann Polytechnic.

June
16 June – The first tree in Singapore is planted in Farrer Circus by Prime Minister Lee Kuan Yew, which is a mempat tree.

July
9 July – The 20-point agreement, submitted by North Borneo, was signed by the UK government and representatives of Malaya, Sabah, Sarawak and Singapore in the run-up to the creation of the Federation of Malaysia.
12 July - Pulau Senang prison riot.

August
8 August – The National Theatre is opened.
25 August – A rally was held in City Hall.
28 August – A report to improve education was released.
31 August – Singapore declared its independence from the United Kingdom, with Yusof bin Ishak as the head of state (Yang di-Pertuan Negara) and Lee Kuan Yew as prime minister; sixteen days later, Singapore would join the Federation of Malaysia, but would declare independence again on 9 August 1965. On the same day, the 1963 State Constitution is adopted.

September
7 September – City Developments Limited is formed as a property group.
16 September – Malaysia is formed from Malaya, Sabah, Sarawak and Singapore.
21 September – The PAP wins the 1963 State Elections, defeating the Barisan Sosialis and UMNO.

November
13 November – The Singapore Association of Trade Unions (SATU) is refused registration for being prejudicial to Singapore's national security, leading to its eventual dissolution.
23 November – Channel 8 is launched as Singapore's second TV channel.

Births
 12 April – Indranee Rajah, Minister in the Prime Minister's Office.
 16 April – Masagos Zulkifli, Minister for Social and Family Development and Second Minister for Health. 
 20 September – Ivan Heng, Stage actor, director, founder of W!LD RICE.
 Koh Buck Song – Writer, journalist.
 Heng Siok Tian – Art educator.
 Yang Lina - Actress (d. 2010).

Deaths
 14 February – Lim Hak Tai – Pioneer artist, art educator (b. 1893).
 18 August – Carl Alexander Gibson-Hill – Last British director of Raffles Museum (present day National Museum of Singapore) (b. 1911).
 Haji Ambo Sooloh – Businessman of Bugis descent (b. 1891).

References

 
Singapore
Years in Singapore